Prothelymna niphostrota is a species of moth in the family Tineidae first described by Edward Meyrick in 1907. This species is endemic to New Zealand.

References

Schoenotenini
Moths described in 1907
Moths of New Zealand
Endemic fauna of New Zealand
Taxa named by Edward Meyrick
Endemic moths of New Zealand